is a Japanese manga artist, animator and illustrator.

Career and legacy 
Hayashi was born in Mukden, Manchuria during the Japanese invasion of Manchuria.

Hayashi attended a design school in Yoyogi, where he learned creating work reminiscent of International Typographic Style. He started his career in 1962 in animation by working for Toei Animation. He was involved in founding the animation studio Knack Productions in 1967.

From 1967 on, he published manga in the alternative manga magazine Garo, which stayed his main outlet for publishing manga. His breakthrough came in 1970 with the manga Red Colored Elegy about the break-up of an unmarried couple. The singer Morio Agata named a popular song of his after the manga.

He became an important figure in the 1960s and 1970s avant-garde arts scene of Tokyo. He is cited with bringing pop art into manga. Apart from manga, he is also known as a designer and illustrator. He designed the packaging of the candy drops Lotte Koume, which came on the market in 1974. He is famous for depicting women in a style similar to Yumeji Takehisa. Film director Seijun Suzuki was a major inspiration for his work.

Hayao Miyazaki names Hayashi as an influence on his work.

Works 

 Red Colored Elegy (赤色エレジー, Sekishoku Erejii, 1970-1971)
 Red Red Rock and Other Stories
 Gold Pollen and Other Stories

References 

Manga artists
Japanese animators
Japanese illustrators
Japanese pop artists
1945 births
Living people